The Reformed Church of Tappan in Tappan, Rockland County, New York (formed, 1694) is a historic church.  It is a contributing property to the Tappan Historic District.

History
Its first structure built 1716 (worshipers met in homes before this), was used in 1780 for the trial of British Major John André, who conspired with Benedict Arnold to buy the plans for the fortifications at West Point for the British and of Joshua Hett Smith, tried for and acquitted of treason.

The church was used in 1778 after the Baylor Massacre as a prison/hospital.

The current building on the site dates from 1835. The building is designed according to the Federal style and was inspired by the Cedar Street Presbyterian Church in Manhattan. It has box pews to help keep in warmth from little foot stoves brought by worshipers in winter.

In its cemetery are buried original settlers of county, early ministers of church, and American Revolutionary War soldiers. Some stones are inscribed in Dutch; there is a marker at this site.

See also
Tappan Historic District
The Burton Store
The Old 76 House

References

External links
Tappantown Historical Society
Tappan Reformed Church

Federal architecture in New York (state)
Reformed Church in America churches in New York (state)
Churches in Rockland County, New York
Historic district contributing properties in New York (state)
Churches completed in 1835
1694 establishments in the Province of New York
National Register of Historic Places in Rockland County, New York
Churches on the National Register of Historic Places in New York (state)